A consumers' co-operative is an enterprise owned by consumers and managed democratically and that aims at fulfilling the needs and aspirations of its members. Such co-operatives operate within the market system, independently of the state, as a form of mutual aid, oriented toward service rather than pecuniary profit. Consumers' cooperatives often take the form of retail outlets owned and operated by their consumers, such as food co-ops. However, there are many types of consumers' cooperatives, operating in areas such as health care, insurance, housing, utilities and personal finance (including credit unions).

In some countries, consumers' cooperatives are known as cooperative retail societies or retail co-ops, though they should not be confused with retailers' cooperatives, whose members are retailers rather than consumers.

Consumers' cooperatives may, in turn, form cooperative federations. These may come in the form of cooperative wholesale societies, through which consumers' cooperatives collectively purchase goods at wholesale prices and, in some cases, own factories. Alternatively, they may be members of cooperative unions.

Consumer cooperation has been a focus of study in the field of cooperative economics.

History

Consumer cooperatives rose to prominence during the industrial revolution as part of the labour movement. As employment moved to industrial areas and job sectors declined, workers began organizing and controlling businesses for themselves. Workers cooperatives were originally sparked by "critical reaction to industrial capitalism and the excesses of the industrial revolution." The formation of some workers cooperatives was meant to "cope with the evils of unbridled capitalism and the insecurities of wage labor."

The first documented consumer cooperative was founded in 1769, in a barely-furnished cottage in Fenwick, East Ayrshire, when local weavers manhandled a sack of oatmeal into John Walker's whitewashed front room and began selling the contents at a discount, forming the Fenwick Weavers' Society.

In the decades that followed, several cooperatives or cooperative societies formed including Lennoxtown Friendly Victualling Society, founded in 1812.

The philosophy that underpinned the cooperative movement stemmed from such socialist writers as Robert Owen and Charles Fourier. Robert Owen,  as the father of the cooperative movement, made his fortune in the cotton trade, but believed in putting his workers in a good environment with access to education for themselves and their children. These ideas were put into effect successfully in the cotton mills of New Lanark, Scotland, where the first co-operative store was opened. Spurred on by this success, Owen had the idea of forming "villages of co-operation" where workers would drag themselves out of poverty by growing their own food, making their own clothes, and ultimately becoming self-governing. He tried to form such communities in Orbiston, Scotland and in New Harmony, Indiana in the United States of America, but both communities failed.

Similar early experiments were made in the early 19th century and by 1830 there were several hundred co-operatives. Dr William King made Owen's ideas more workable and practical. He believed in starting small, and realized that the working classes would need to set up co-operatives for themselves, so he saw his role as one of instruction. He founded a monthly periodical called The Co-operator, the first edition of which appeared on 1 May 1828. It gave a mixture of co-operative philosophy and practical advice about running a shop using cooperative principles.

Modern movement

The first successful co-operative was the Rochdale Society of Equitable Pioneers, established in England in 1844. This became the basis for the development and growth of the modern cooperative movement. As the mechanization of the Industrial Revolution forced more skilled workers into poverty, these tradesmen decided to band together to open their own store selling food items they could not otherwise afford.

With lessons from prior failed attempts at co-operation in mind, they designed the now-famous Rochdale Principles, and over a period of four months they struggled to pool one pound sterling per person for a total of 28 pounds of capital. On December 21, 1844, they opened their store with a very meagre selection of butter, sugar, flour, oatmeal and a few candles. Within three months, they expanded their selection to include tea and tobacco, and they were soon known for providing high quality, unadulterated goods.

The Co-operative Group formed gradually over 140 years from the merger of many independent retail societies, and their wholesale societies and federations. In 1863, twenty years after the Rochdale Pioneers opened their co-operative, the North of England Co-operative Society was launched by 300 individual co-ops across Yorkshire and Lancashire. By 1872, it had become known as the Co-operative Wholesale Society (CWS). Through the 20th century, smaller societies merged with CWS, such as the Scottish Co-operative Wholesale Society (1973) and the South Suburban Co-operative Society (1984).

Governance and operation
Consumer cooperatives utilize the cooperative principle of democratic member control, or one member/one vote. Most consumer cooperatives have a board of directors elected by and from the membership. The board is usually responsible for hiring management and ensuring that the cooperative meets its goals, both financial and otherwise. Democratic functions, such as petitioning or recall of board members, may be codified in the bylaws or organizing document of the cooperative. Most consumer cooperatives hold regular membership meetings (often once a year). As mutually owned businesses, each member of a society has a shareholding equal to the sum they paid in when they joined.

Large consumers' co-ops are run much like any other business and require workers, managers, clerks, products, and customers to keep the doors open and the business running. In smaller businesses the consumer/owners are often workers as well. Consumers' cooperatives can differ greatly in start up and also in how the co-op is run but to be true to the consumers' cooperative form of business the enterprise should follow the Rochdale Principles.

Finance and approach to capital accumulation

The customers or consumers of the goods and/or services the cooperative provides are often also the individuals who have provided the capital required to launch or purchase that enterprise.

The major difference between consumers' cooperatives and other forms of business is that the purpose of a consumers' cooperative association is to provide quality goods and services at the lowest cost to the consumer/owners rather than to sell goods and services at the highest price above cost that the consumer is willing to pay.  In practice consumers' cooperatives price goods and services at competitive market rates.

Where a for-profit enterprise will treat the difference between cost (including labor etc.) and selling price as financial gain for investors, the consumer owned enterprise may retain this to accumulate capital in common ownership, distribute it to meet the consumer's social objectives, or refund this sum to the consumer/owner as an over-payment. (Accumulated capital may be held as reserves, or invested in growth as working capital or the purchase of capital assets such as plant and buildings.)

While some claim that surplus payment returns to consumer/owner patrons should be taxed the same as dividends paid to corporate stock holders, others argue that consumer cooperatives do not return a profit by traditional definition, and similar tax standards do not apply.

Problems
Since consumer cooperatives are run democratically, they are subject to the same problems typical of democratic government. Such difficulties can be mitigated by frequently providing member/owners with reliable educational materials regarding current business conditions. In addition, because a consumer cooperative is owned by the users of a good or service as opposed to the producers of that good or service, the same sorts of labor issues may arise between the workers and the cooperative as would appear in any other company. This is one critique of consumer cooperatives in favor of worker cooperatives.

Pursuit of social goals
Many advocates of the formation of consumer cooperatives—from a variety of political perspectives—have seen them as integral to the achievement of wider social goals.

For example, the founding document of the Rochdale Pioneers, who established one of the earliest consumer cooperatives in England in 1844, expressed a vision that went far beyond the simple shop with which they began:

Cooperative Federalists, a term coined in the writings of Beatrice Webb, advocated forming federations of consumer cooperatives as a means to achieve social reform. They believed such a development would bring benefits such as economic democracy and justice, transparency, greater product purity, and financial benefits for consumers.

Examples

Europe

One of the world's largest consumer co-operative federations operates in the UK as The Co-op, which operates over 5,500 branches of 'Co-op' branded business including Co-op Food (the UK's sixth largest supermarket chain), Co-op Funeralcare, Co-op Travel, Co-op Legal Services, and Co-op Electrical. The Co-operative Group is by far the largest of these businesses, itself having over 4,500 outlets and operating the collective buying group.

In Switzerland, the two largest supermarket chains Coop and Migros are both co-operatives and are among the country’s largest employers.

In Ireland, the Dublin Food Coop has been in operation since 1983.

In Scandinavia, the national cooperatives Norway, Sweden, and Denmark joined as Coop Norden in January 2002, but separated again in 2008.

In Italy, the Coop Italia chain formed by many sub-cooperatives controlled 17.7% of the grocery market in 2005.

In Finland, the S Group is owned by 22 regional cooperatives and 19 local cooperative stores, which in turn are owned by their customers. In 2005 the S Group overtook its nearest rival Kesko Oyj with a 36% share of retail grocery sales compared to Kesko's 28%.

In France, Coop Atlantique owns 7 hypermarkets, 39 supermarkets, and about 200 convenience stores.

In Germany, the ReWe Group is a diversified holding company of consumer cooperatives that includes thousands of retail stores, discount stores, and tourism agencies. It ranks as the second largest supermarket chain in Germany and in the top ten cooperative groups in the world.

In Spain, Eroski is a supermarket chain within Mondragón Corporación Cooperativa.
As a worker-consumer hybrid, some of the personnel are hired workers and some are owner-workers.
The owners include workers and mere consumers, but buying is open to everybody.
It has franchises under the brand Aliprox not owned by Eroski but sharing its product range.
Its origin is in the Basque Country.
In its process of expansion, it merged with the Valencia-based cooperative Consum, but the merger dissolved in 2005.
It has expanded across Spain and entered France and Gibraltar.
After the Spanish crisis of 2008, Eroski sold several of its supermarkets and hypermarkets.

Australia
The Co-op Bookshop sold textbooks both online and on university campuses. It also owned Australian Geographic. In 2020 its retail stores closed and its online store was sold to Booktopia.

The Wine Society (Australian Wine Consumers’ Co-operative Society Limited), established in 1946, now has more than 58,000 members. It sources and sells premium wines under the Society label, runs comprehensive wine education courses, and recognises excellence from young winemakers.

Bank Australia was formed in 2011 as the Members and Education Credit Union. It changed its name to Bank Australia in 2015. The bank is wholly owned by its customers, reported at 125,000 in 2012.

Japan
Japan has a large and well-developed consumer cooperative movement with more than 14 million members. Retail co-ops alone had a combined turnover of 2.5 trillion Yen (21 billion U.S. Dollars) in April, 2003. Co-op Kobe (コープこうべ) in the Hyōgo Prefecture is the largest retail cooperative in Japan and, with more than 1.2 million members, is one of the largest cooperatives in the world. In addition to retail co-ops there are medical, housing, and insurance co-ops alongside institutional (workplace based) co-ops, co-ops for school teachers, and university-based co-ops.

Approximately one in five of all Japanese households belongs to a local retail co-op and 90% of all co-op members are women. Nearly six million households belong to one of the 1,788,000 Han groups. These consist of a group of five to ten members in a neighbourhood who place a combined weekly order which is then delivered by truck the following week. A strength of Japanese consumer co-ops in recent years has been the growth of community supported agriculture in which fresh produce is sent direct to consumers from producers without going through the market.

Some of co-op organisations, for example, in Tokyo metropolis and Kanagawa prefecture, manage their local political parties from 1970's; generally names itself as the "Network Movement" ("Tokyo Seikatsusha (it means "Living Persons") Network", "Kanagawa Network Movement", and so on). They depend on consumers movement, feminism, regionalism, and prefer to anti-nuclear. These parties keep small but steady sections in prefecture and municipal assemblies.

North America
In the United States, the PCC (Puget Consumers Cooperative) Natural Markets in Seattle is the largest consumer-owned food cooperative. The National Cooperative Grocers Association maintains a food cooperative directory.

Seattle-based R.E.I., which specializes in outdoor sporting equipment, is the largest consumer cooperative in the United States.

Outdoor retailer Mountain Equipment Co-op (MEC) in Canada was one of that country's major consumer cooperatives. In the Canadian Prairie provinces as well as British Columbia, gas stations, lumberyards, and grocery stores can be found under the Co-Op brand.

All credit unions in the United States and Canada are financial cooperatives. Tim Worstall has called the Vanguard Group a customer owned cooperative, since the owners of Vanguard funds are the funds' investors.

Caribbean
In Puerto Rico, several Supermercados Fam Coop operate.

See also
Food cooperative, a supermarket owned and operated by its consumers.
Copyleft
GNU General Public License
Health food store
Healthcare Co-operatives movement in India
National Cooperative Business Association
Open source
Open-source hardware
US Federation of Worker Cooperatives

Notes

Further reading

Co-operation 1921-1947, published monthly by The Co-operative League of America.  fully searchable original link 
The History of Co-operation, by George Jacob Holyoake, 1908.  fully searchable original link
Why Co-ops? What Are They? How Do They Work? A pamphlet from the G.I. Roundtable series by Joseph G. Knapp, 1944
Law of Cooperatives, by Legal Firm Stoel Rives, Seattle

External links
 Cooperatives Europe – The common platform of ICA Europe and the Coordinating Committee of European Cooperative Associations (CCACE)
 International Co-operative Alliance
 Consumer Cooperatives Worldwide (sector of ICA)
 Co-operatives UK, the central organisation for all UK co-operative enterprises
 The online database of UK Co-operatives
 ICOS, the Irish Co-operative Organisation Society
 German technical consulting for optimization
  The ICA Group, technical advice for cooperative start-ups in the USA.
 English website from the Japanese Consumer Co-operative Union.
 A new approach to cooperative understanding
 University of Wisconsin Center for Cooperatives
 Coopnet Update paper and event database
 Dissecting Healthcare Co-op
 Background Paper on Co-operatives
 Brazda&Schediwy (ed.) Comparative International Study, 1989

 
Business models